The following highways are numbered 606:

Afghanistan
Route 606 (Afghanistan)

Canada
Highway 606 (Ontario)
Saskatchewan Highway 606

Costa Rica
 National Route 606

United Kingdom
 M606 motorway

United States

See also
Loudoun Gateway (WMATA station), a planned Washington Metro station formerly named Route 606
Wind Chill - a horror film taking place on a "Route 606"